Jehan de Nuevile (c.1200–c.1250) was the second son of the Eustache de Nuevile, a minor nobleman with land in Neuville-Vitasse, near Arras. Jehan succeeded to the patrimony on the death of his elder brother, Eustache. He himself was dead by 1254, when his younger brother, Gilles, appears as lord at Neuville. Jehan is better known as a trouvère.

Colart le Boutellier dedicated one of his songs to Jehan. The song L'autrier par un matinet, dedicated to Colart, may be a response from Jehan, although there are competing attributions. The Chansonnier du Roi (BnF fr.844) ascribes sixteen chansons courtoises to Jehan in its table of contents, although six of these are attributed to two other poets, Gautier d'Espinal and Guiot de Dijon, in the rubrics. Only three of Jehan's pieces survive with melodies in the Chansonnier to Roi and these are his only pieces to appear in other manuscripts:
Desoremais est raison
Quant li boscages retentist
L'autrier par un matinet
Jehan's chansons are generally heptasyllabic and isometric. All are in bar form. Also surviving on Jehan's name is a complainte, an Old French variant of the Old Occitan planh, a form rare in northern France. Its music is lost.

References
Theodore Karp. "Jehan de Nuevile." Grove Music Online. Oxford Music Online. Accessed 20 September 2008.

Trouvères
1250s deaths
Year of birth uncertain
Male classical composers